Huascaromusca is a genus of blow fly in the family Mesembrinellidae.

Species
H. aeneiventris (Wiedemann, 1830)
H. bequaerti (Séguy, 1925)
H. decrepita (Séguy, 1925)
H. lara Bonatto and Marinoni, 2005
H. purpurata (Aldrich, 1922)
H. semiflava (Aldrich, 1925)
H. uniseta (Aldrich, 1925)
H. vogelsangi Mello, 1967

References

Mesembrinellidae
Diptera of South America